Beongcheon Yu (29 December 1925 – 23 November 2022) was a Korean-born translator of Natsume Sōseki's novel The Wayfarer and author of a critical study on Natsume. He also wrote studies of Lafcadio Hearn. Yu was born in Korea on 29 December 1925. He attended the First Higher School in Tokyo, now known as the University of Tokyo, and received his BA from Seoul National University in 1948. He received his MA from the University of Missouri-Kansas City in 1954 and his PhD from Brown University in 1958. He wrote a review of Herman Melville's Moby Dick, "Ishmael's Equal Eye: The Source of Balance in Moby Dick." Yu was professor emeritus in English at Wayne State University.

Yu died in Paris on 23 November 2022, at the age of 96.

Works

Original works

English-language

Books

Papers

Korean-language

Translations
 
 Reprinted 1969 by C. E. Tuttle (Tokyo). . LCCN 76446909. .
 Reprinted 1982 by Putnam (New York). . LCCN 81015429. .

References

External links
 https://web.archive.org/web/20120206021749/http://www.xmlwriter.com/books/viewbook/Contemporary_Authors%3A_Biography___Yu%2C_Beongcheon_%281925_%29-B0007SGC7A.html A digital biography of Beongchan Yu

1925 births
2022 deaths
Japanese–English translators
Brown University alumni
Wayne State University faculty
South Korean emigrants to the United States
University of Missouri–Kansas City alumni